The Commander-in-Chief's Guard – also known as the CINC Guard but officially Company A, 4th Battalion, 3rd U.S. Infantry Regiment – is a infantry unit of the United States Army that also has public duties and riot control missions within the Washington metropolitan area. Posted at Joint Base Myer–Henderson Hall in Arlington, VA, it is the nominal continuation of George Washington's bodyguard. The Commander-in-Chief's Guard is designated by the U.S. Army as a "Special Ceremonial Unit" and is part of the 3rd Infantry Regiment, the United States' presidential escort regiment.

History and mission

The original Commander-in-Chief's Guard, from which Company A claims nominal lineage, was authorized on March 11, 1776 and organized the next day at Cambridge, Massachusetts as the bodyguard and personal escort to Gen. George Washington. To the consternation of the revolutionary government in Philadelphia, it came to be referred to as "His Excellency's Guard"  and "Washington's Life Guard"; in April 1777 the Second Continental Congress warned that the use of such monikers in official communications was prohibited. The Commander-in-Chief's Guard had a fluctuating strength that normally hovered between 180 and 250 men and was disbanded on November 15, 1783.

The 3rd Infantry Regiment, of which Company A is part, was activated on June 3, 1784 and deactivated in 1946. In 1948 the regiment was reactivated and tasked with the military defense of the District of Columbia. The former "ceremonial detachment" of the Military District of Washington, a company-sized public duties unit, was reassigned to the 3rd Infantry Regiment as Company A, 4th Battalion. In December 1973, in preparation for celebrations of the U.S. bicentennial, Company A was designated the Commander-in-Chief's Guard and took its current form.

In its public duties role, the Commander-in-Chief's Guard supports general officer retirement ceremonies, state arrivals, and the presidential inauguration.

Uniform and equipment
Posted at Fort Myer, the CINC Guard is a "Special Ceremonial Unit," a U.S. Army designation for units authorized uniforms other than the Army Service Uniform when executing public duties. Its ceremonial uniform consists of blue greatcoats and white coveralls. Cover consists of black tricorn hats and white powdered wigs. It is equipped with muskets modeled on the Brown Bess (a design first developed in 1722 for service with the British Army), instead of the M14 rifle issued to the rest of the regiment for public duties.

The CINC Guard advances a flag that is a modified version of the personal position standard of George Washington.

See also
 Old Guard Fife and Drum Corps
 U.S. Army Herald Trumpets

References

External links
 CINC Guard Facebook page

Military in Washington, D.C.
Ceremonial units of the United States military
Military units and formations established in 1948